The 2013–14 Creighton Bluejays men's basketball team represented Creighton University during the 2013–14 NCAA Division I men's basketball season. The Bluejays, led by fourth-year head coach Greg McDermott, played their home games at the CenturyLink Center Omaha, and were in their first season as members of the Big East Conference. They finished the season 27–8, 14–4 in Big East play to finish in second place. They advanced to the championship game of the Big East tournament where they lost to Providence. They received an at-large bid to the NCAA tournament where they defeated Louisiana–Lafayette in the first round before losing in the second round to Baylor.

Roster

Depth chart

Rankings

Schedule and results 

|-
!colspan=12 style="background:#0C5FA8; color:#FFFFFF;"| Exhibition

|-
!colspan=12 style="background:#0C5FA8; color:#FFFFFF;"| Regular season

|-
!colspan=12 style="background:#0C5FA8; color:#FFFFFF;"| Big East tournament

|-
!colspan=12 style="background:#0C5FA8; color:#FFFFFF;"| NCAA tournament

References

Creighton Bluejays
Creighton Bluejays men's basketball seasons
Creighton
Creighton Bluejays men's bask
Creighton Bluejays men's bask